Pete Carroll (born 1951) is an American football coach.

Peter Carroll may also refer to:

 Peter Carroll (actor) (born 1944), Australian actor
 Peter Carroll (rugby league) (born 1932), Australian rugby league player
 Peter Carroll (sportsman) (born 1941), Australian cricketer and rugby union player
 Peter J. Carroll (born 1953), English modern occultist and author

See also
Pete Carril (1930–2022), American basketball coach
Peter Carrell (born 1959), New Zealand Anglican bishop